Paavo Nikula (born 15 August 1942, in Helsinki) is a former Chancellor of Justice of Finland and a former Member of the Parliament of Finland. He served as the Minister of Justice from 1978-1979. He served as Chancellor of Justice from 1998 until his resignation in 2007. During his term, Nikula voiced opposition to a proposal that would allow employers to monitor the emails of their employees (the so-called ).

References

External links 
 The Office of the Chancellor of Justice

1942 births
Living people
Politicians from Helsinki
Liberal League (Finland) politicians
Liberals (Finland) politicians
Green League politicians
Ministers of Justice of Finland
Chancellors of Justice of Finland
Members of the Parliament of Finland (1991–95)
Members of the Parliament of Finland (1995–99)